Nova Cinema may refer to:
 Nova Cinema (Greece)
 Nova Cinema (Czech Republic)